(Foochow Romanized: Diòng-lŏ̤h) is one of 6 urban districts of the prefecture-level city of Fuzhou, the capital of Fujian Province, China. Changle was established in the sixth year of Emperor Wude (623 AD) during the Tang dynasty, and it became a county-level city on February 18, 1994. The district faces the East China Sea and is connected to Mawei district by the Min River. Due to an increase in businesses, the province is now one of the richest provinces in China. The city was upgraded to a district in August 2017 by a government proposal.

Located  outside downtown Fuzhou, Changle has a total population of 680,000 and is the hometown of more than 700,000 overseas Chinese.

Transportation

Air
The Fuzhou Changle International Airport is a major airport located in the Zhanggang Subdistrict (formerly, Zhanggang Town) of Changle. This airport services the entire northern Fujian area, and it has regular scheduled flights to many domestic and international destinations.

Major highways
Airport Express Way (Toll Road), Shenghai Express Way and Fujian Provincial Highways S201 and S203

Railways
Presently, there are no railways in Changle. (The Fuxia Railway skirts the western edge of the district, but has no stations there). The closest railway stations are in Fuzhou.

However, in November 2012 a plan has been approved for an 88.5-km-long railway from Fuzhou to Pingtan Island. The railway will run across Changle, and will have 3 stations within the district (Changle, Changle East, and Songxia).  It is expected that the work will start by the end of 2012, and would take about five and a half years.

Demographics

Overseas Changle

Natives of Changle receive large amount of financial support from overseas, due to there being a significant population of immigrants from Changle overseas, particularly in the US and Canada. The focal point for the US is in New York City with Fuzhouese ethnic enclaves present in all five boroughs. Notable enclaves include Little Fuzhou in East Broadway of Chinatown, Manhattan and more recently, due to gentrification, in Flushing, Queens and 8th avenue of Sunset Park, Brooklyn. A 2001 study by the Changle government found that about 400,000 people from Changle and their descendants were living abroad.

The area has been nicknamed the "Hometown of Overseas Chinese" due to the large number of natives that have move abroad.

Notable natives and residents

 One well known Changle native is author Shie Wan Yin, whose pen name is Bing Xin
 Changle is the ancestral home of Zheng Zhenduo, a master of literature.
 Naval explorer, Admiral Zheng He

Migrant workers
Currently, there are about 200,000 non-native migrant workers working in Changle. Many of them come from Sichuan province.

Tourist attractions

One of the attractions in Changle is the natural environment. Situated on the banks of the Min River, the region is surrounded by mountains and hills. There are many parks and trails which are destinations for locals and tourists alike. However, industrialization of the region has impacted these areas.

Some of the tourist attractions include Xiasha Seaside Vocational Center, Jingang Leg, Bing Xing Literacy Archives, and Nanshan Park.  A number of overseas remittances, particularly from the US, has been used to construct some of these areas, particularly the parks, over the last few years. Because of this, many of these areas are essentially new and attract a considerable number of visitors.

Some attractions are:

 Zheng He Museum and Park
 Jin Gang Tui Park (A Buddhist's Giant Leg)

 Bin Xin Museum
 Qinjiang Manzu Jie (Manchurian Vallige)
 Xiasha Beach Resort
 Xianyin Palace
 Tianfei Palace
 Hexia Street (Beneath River Street)

Culture

Local language

Most locals are capable of speaking both Mandarin Chinese (Putonghua) and the Fuzhou dialect, though Mandarin is spoken in more formal settings such as schools.

At home, Fuzhou dialect is the norm. Older generations typically have a strong accent when speaking in Mandarin due to their mother tongue being the Fuzhou dialect, which does not distinguish between z and zh, c and ch, s and sh initials or n and ng finals.

The younger generation prefers pop culture, arts, music and other forms of entertainment from Hong Kong and the West. The older generation of Changleners enjoy Min Opera, a form of Chinese opera.

Shopping and dining
International fast food chains have been present for a long time and high end brands are trying to get in to the Fuzhounese market, with their high disposable income and expensive tastes.

Cuisine
Due to geographic location, Changle cuisine consists of a lot of seafood, such as clams, shrimps, conch, sea snails, etc.
 Fish balls A ball-shaped food made from minced fish meat, egg whites, and sweet potato starch. It is known for its chewy texture and umami taste. Some fish balls contain no fillings, while others contain a filling made from minced pork and scallions.
 Fish Noodles A noodle made from fish and starch.
 Bian Rou Literally means "ground meat." It is Fujian style wonton soup. It features a thin wonton skin and a pork filling.
Rou Yan It literally translates to “Meat Swallow”, as in the passerine birds. It is very similar to Bian Rou, but the wrapper of Rou Yan is made from pork meat. The locals use lean pork and pound it with a wooden stick, then combine sweet potato starch with the pork to make the wrapper. The fillings consist of ground pork, scallion, and sometimes small dried shrimp. The name Rou Yan or “Meat Swallow” comes from the fact that the food resembles a swallow. 
 Ban Mian Noodles with a peanut butter like sauce. Although not native to Changle, Ban Mian is still common all over the district. Another common ingredient in ban mian is lard or pork fat. Although proven unhealthy, the lard adds a special fragrance to the dish. When the dish is presented to the customer, the customer is expected to mix the sauce and the noodle themselves. Because the sauce is made from a combination  of soy sauce, peanut butter, and lard, it can solidify very quickly. So before eating the dish, the customer has to mix the noodle with the sauce thoroughly. Hence the dish is called Ban Mian, because Ban means mix in Chinese, and Mian means noodles.
Jia Yu Wan Another very common and popular Changle food. The translation means "fake fish ball". It is like the traditional fish ball, with similar fillings, but the difference is from the exterior. Unlike Yun Wan or fish balls, which contain an exterior made of fish meat, the exteriors of Jia Yu Wan are made from mashed potatoes combine with sweet potato starch. Many people prefer “fake fish balls” over “fish balls” because of the contrast between the sweet exterior from the potato and the savory interior pork filling.
Ice Rice is a traditional dessert that originated from Changle, China. It's made with a base of sweetened water and sticky rice, a layer of bean paste, and different toppings.

Administration
Changle is divided among four subdistricts, twelve towns, and two townships:

 Wuhang Subdistrict
 Hangcheng Subdistrict
 Zhanggang Subdistrict
 Yingqian Subdistrict
 Meihua Town, across from Juguang, Lienchiang, Taiwan (ROC)
 Jinfeng Town
 Tantou Town
 Yutian Town
 Jiangtian Town
 Guhuai Town
 Heshang Town
 Shouzhan Town
 Wenwusha Town
 Hunan Town
 Wenling Town
 Songxia Town
 Luolian Township
 Houyu Township

Education system

Colleges 
 Fuzhou College of Foreign Studies and Trade, Changle Campus (Shouzhan Town) 福州外语外贸学院长乐校区，首占

High schools 
 No.1 Junior High School (Wuhan Town) 长乐一中，吴航
 Huaqiao Junior High and Senior School (Wuhan Town) 长乐侨中，吴航
 No.2 Junior High School (Jinfeng Town) 长乐二中，金峰
 Changle Junior High School (formerly known as 'Changle Normal School', Wuhan Town) 长乐高级中学(原为长乐师范学校)
 No.3 Junior High School (Guhuai Town) 长乐三中，古槐
 No.7 Junior High School (Jiangtian Town) 长乐七中(或称长乐智化中学)，江田
 No.4 Junior High School (Yutian Town) 长乐四中，玉田
 No.6 Junior High School (Yingqian Town) 长乐六中，营前
 No.5 Junior High School (Tantou Town) 长乐五中，潭头

Climate

Notes

Further reading
 Gao Yutong, ed. Changle City Annals. 中华人民共和囯地方志. 2001.

External links 
  Changle News (Chinese)

Districts of China
County-level divisions of Fujian
Fuzhou